The 2009 UCF Knights football team represented the University of Central Florida in the 2009 NCAA Division I FBS football season. Their head coach was George O'Leary, in his sixth season with the team. Coaching changes included new offensive coordinator Charlie Taaffe. For the third season, the UCF Knights played all of their home games at Bright House Networks Stadium on the school's main campus in Orlando, Florida.

All games were broadcast live on the UCF-ISP Sports radio network. The flagship was WYGM "740 The Game" in Orlando, which had returned to a sports talk format after a year's absence but retained UCF's rights throughout. The games were called by Marc Daniels (play-by-play) and Gary Parris (color commentary), with Scott Adams and Jerry O'Neill as field reporters.

For the season, the Knights had an 8–5 record, 6–2 in Conference USA, and placed second in the Eastern Division. The Knights finished the season with a six-game conference winning streak, after starting conference play 0–2. The season included a 37–32 Homecoming win over the Houston Cougars, who were ranked #12 in the Coaches' Poll, marking the first time in program history that the Knights had defeated a ranked opponent. For the third time in five years, the Knights became bowl eligible and lost to Rutgers in the St. Petersburg Bowl.

Personnel

Coaching staff 

On January 5, 2009, UCF hired Charlie Taaffe to be the team's new Offensive coordinator. The change occurred amid a staff shake-up by Head Coach George O'Leary after a disappointing 2008 season. Tim Salem, whom Taaffe replaced, will transition to being the tight-ends coach and special-teams coordinator, 2008 quarterbacks coach George Godsey will move to be the running-backs coach, and Brent Key will move from being the tight-ends coach and special-teams coordinator to offensive-line coach.

Recruiting class

Schedule

Game summaries

Samford 

UCF and Samford last met for a Homecoming game in the 1990s.

Southern Miss 

UCF and Southern Miss last met in Orlando on November 8, 2008. UCF lost the game 17-6.

Buffalo 

UCF and Buffalo last met in Orlando in 2003.

East Carolina 

UCF and East Carolina last met in Orlando on November 2, 2008. East Carolina won the game in overtime 13–10.

Memphis 

UCF and Memphis last met in Memphis on November 22, 2008. UCF won the game 28–21.

Miami 

UCF and Miami met for the first time on October 11, 2008 in Miami. Miami won the game 20–14.

There were 48,453 fans on hand to watch the game, which was the largest crowd to watch a football game at Bright House Networks Stadium.

Rice 

UCF and Rice last met in 2006.

Marshall 

UCF and Marshall last met on November 15, 2008 in Huntington. UCF won the game 30–14. UCF is 5–3 all time versus Marshall. Marshall was leading 20-7 with less than 8 minutes to go in the game, but UCF staged a comeback to win the game 21-20.

Texas 

UCF and Texas last met on September 15, 2007 for the inaugural game at Bright House Networks Stadium in Orlando. #8 Texas won the game 35–32.

Houston 

UCF and Houston last met on October 28, 2006 in Houston. The Cougars won the game 51–31. This was the first time in the program's history that the Knights proved victorious over a ranked opponent. UCF is now 20–10 all time on Homecoming weekend.

Tulane 

UCF and Tulane last met in 2006 in New Orleans. The Green Wave won the game.

UAB 

UCF and UAB last met on November 29, 2008 in Orlando. The Blazers won the game 15–0.

St. Petersburg Bowl 

UCF had been bowl eligible for three of the past five seasons. UCF was 0–3 in bowl games until this point. This game marked the first meeting between the two teams.

References

UCF
UCF Knights football seasons
UCF Knights football